"Habeas Tortoise" is the thirty-fourth season premiere of the American animated television series The Simpsons, and the 729th episode overall. It aired in the United States on Fox on September 25, 2022. The episode was directed by Matthew Faughnan, and written by Broti Gupta.

Plot
Homer is publicly humiliated at a town meeting, ashamed that people think he is dumb. To make him feel better, Marge takes him on a trip to the zoo where he is excited to see a tortoise named Slow Leonard, only to find that the tortoise is missing. Determined to solve the mystery and to prove his intelligence, Homer reviews pictures from the trip and finds dolly tracks near Leonard's habitat, suspecting that he was stolen. He presents the clue to Chief Wiggum, who does not take him seriously.

At Marge's suggestion, Homer finds a group about Slow Leonard on Facelook and posts his theory, which is positively received by group members Comic Book Guy, Gil Gunderson, Ms. Hoover, Sideshow Mel and Drederick Tatum. Live-streaming his theories from the zoo to his Facelook friends, he recruits Superintendent Chalmers for his group, and invites his friends over to collaborate and exchange ideas. After Homer protests outside the zookeeper's house, during which an interested Wiggum joins the group and Gil proposes to Hoover, Marge worries that Homer is taking his conspiracy theories too far, but he says that he enjoys the company of his group.

Homer soon inadvertently finds Slow Leonard while exploring a rabbit burrow after a protest. Fearful that he will lose his friends if the mystery is solved, Homer tries to keep Leonard secret, but during Gil and Hoover's wedding reception, he overhears his group coming up with increasingly violent ideas on how to get information from the zookeeper, whom Homer knows is innocent. Horrified, he and Marge confess that they have found Slow Leonard. The group worry that they may drift apart having nothing in common besides solving conspiracies, so Homer quickly comes up with a new conspiracy theory — the source of calamari — which they discuss at his house while unknowingly being spied on by the Illuminati.

During the credits, Homer posts a TikTok video showcasing a paella recipe.

Production
The episode was originally named "Habeus Tortoise". The "Dinosaur Game" couch gag was made by Katrin von Niederhäusern and Janine Wiget.

Cultural references
The title of the episode is a reference to the Habeas corpus.

A song sung by Superintendent Chalmers is a parody of Sam Cooke's "Wonderful World".

Reception

Viewing figures
The episode was watched by 4.15 million viewers. This is up from the previous season premiere (3.48 million viewers).

Critical response
Tony Sokol of Den of Geek gave the episode 4 out of 5 stars, stating "Every line is witty, and the setup is ridiculously brilliant in its skewering of the communities which cycle around fake news and ad hoc conjecture. Villainy is thwarted by armchair detectives who finally get off the couch, but Homer could have solved it sitting down. Clever more than comic, The Simpsons season 34 opener provides chuckles in a nuanced offering which is less than classic."

Marcus Gibson of Bubbleblabber gave the episode a 7.5 out of 10 stating, "It’s no conspiracy that 'Habeus Tortoise' is a decently enjoyable start to the show's 34th season. There's nothing too special about Homer's search for acceptance. Still, the season premiere offers a humorous trip down the Conspiracy Hole that exposes the dangers of providing false theories and pokes fun at them. If I were to make my own conspiracy theory, it would be that the rest of the season would be as fun as this episode."

References

External links
 

2022 American television episodes
The Simpsons (season 34) episodes